In mathematics, a monothetic group is a topological group with a dense cyclic subgroup. An example is the additive group of p-adic integers, in which the integers are dense.

A monothetic group is necessarily abelian.

References

 

Topological groups
Properties of groups